General elections were held in Guyana on 28 November 2011. The result was a victory for the People's Progressive Party, which won 32 of the 65 seats. Thus even though the combined parliamentary opposition, consisting of the A Partnership for National Unity coalition (APNU) and the Alliance for Change (AFC), managed to secure an absolute majority of 33 seats, as they had not run as a single list it was Donald Ramotar of the PPP (the largest single party) who assumed the presidency, and not David A. Granger of the PNC (which heads the opposition).

Electoral system
The 65 members of the National Assembly were elected by closed list proportional representation in two groups; 25 members were elected from the 10 electoral districts based on the regions, and 40 elected from a single nationwide constituency. Seats were allocated using the Hare quota.

The President was elected by a first-past-the-post double simultaneous vote system, whereby each list nominated a presidential candidate and the presidential election itself was won by the candidate of the list having a plurality.

Presidential candidates
The ruling People's Progressive Party nominated Donald Ramotar, the party's general secretary and advisor to outgoing President Bharrat Jagdeo. A Partnership for National Unity (an alliance of the People's National Congress, the Guyana Action Party and the Working People's Alliance) nominated David A. Granger, a former commander of the Guyana Defence Force. The Alliance for Change did not join the APNU, and opted to run alone, fielding party leader Khemraj Ramjattan as its presidential candidate. The United Force nominated Peter Persaud as its presidential candidates following a leadership dispute.

Police protection
Election Day, November 28 was declared a national holiday and troops patrolled the streets in order to prevent violence as had happened in previous elections.

Results

By region

Aftermath
The PPP won for the fifth straight time, but with a minority government. PPP candidate Donald Ramotar was elected President, but the opposition parties won a majority in the National Assembly.

References

2011
2011 elections in South America
2011 in Guyana
November 2011 events in South America